CDNB may refer to:

 The Concise Dictionary of National Biography
 1-Chloro-2,4-dinitrobenzene